The 1964 Icelandic Cup was the fifth edition of the National Football Cup.

It took place between 4 August 1964 and 24 October 1964, with the final played at Melavöllur in Reykjavik. The cup became more important from this season, as winners qualified for the UEFA Cup Winners' Cup (if a club won both the league and the cup, the defeated finalists would take their place in the Cup Winners' Cup). Teams from the Úrvalsdeild karla (1st division) did not enter until the quarter finals. In prior rounds, teams from the 2. Deild (2nd division), as well as reserve teams, played in one-legged matches. In case of a draw, the match was replayed.

For the fifth consecutive year, KR Reykjavik reached the final, beating IA Akranes 4 - 0. In a first for the competition, there was a match between KR and their own reserve team, for a place in the final.

First round

Second round 
 Entrance of Breiðablik Kopavogur, FH Hafnarfjörður and ÍBA Akureyri.

Third round

Quarter finals 
 Entrance of 6 clubs from 1. Deild

Semi finals

Final

See also 

 1964 Úrvalsdeild
 Icelandic Cup

External links 
 1964 Icelandic Cup results at the site of the Icelandic Football Federation 

Icelandic Men's Football Cup
Iceland
1964 in Iceland